
Leszno County is a unit of territorial administration and local government (powiat) in Greater Poland Voivodeship, west-central Poland. It came into being on January 1, 1999, as a result of the Polish local government reforms passed in 1998. Its administrative seat is the city of Leszno, although the city is not part of the county (it constitutes a separate city county).

As of 2021 its total population is 58,255, out of which the population of Rydzyna is 9,962, that of Osieczna is 9,311, and the rural population is 38,982.

Neighbouring counties
Apart from the city of Leszno, Leszno County is also bordered by Kościan County to the north, Gostyń County to the east, Rawicz County to the south-east, Góra County to the south, Wschowa County to the west, and Wolsztyn County to the north-west.

Administrative division
The county is subdivided into seven gminas (two urban-rural and five rural). These are listed in the following table, in descending order of population.

References

 
Leszno